"Over My Head" is a soft rock song performed by British-American rock band Fleetwood Mac. The song was written by group keyboardist and vocalist Christine McVie. "Over My Head" was the band's first single to reach the Billboard Hot 100 since "Oh Well", ending a six-year dry spell on the American charts.

Background
Christine McVie composed the song using a portable Hohner electric piano in a small apartment in Malibu, California, where she and then-husband John McVie (Fleetwood Mac's bassist) resided after completing a concert tour to promote Heroes Are Hard to Find, the previous album.

The lyrics were inspired by her relationship with bandmate Lindsey Buckingham. “I think that was based on a sort of fantasy about Lindsey, really. I think that was a sort of an ode to the gorgeous Lindsey at the time.” The original rhythm track consisted of just vocals, drums and a Dobro. Other instruments were added later to embellish the song, including McVie's Vox Continental organ. In a 1975 review, Billboard described McVie's vocal performance as "a completely distinctive voice, with a sexy huskiness that is unique in pop today."

In the U.S., Reprise Records selected "Over My Head" as the lead single from the 1975 LP Fleetwood Mac, a decision that surprised the band, who believed that the song was the "least likely track on Fleetwood Mac to be released as a single." Nevertheless, the song reached No. 20 on the Billboard Hot 100 chart in early 1976. The single's success helped the group's eponymous 1975 album sell 8 million units.

The 45 RPM single version of the song released for radio airplay was a remixed, edited version that differed from the version on the Fleetwood Mac album. The single version is distinguished by a cold start (rather than the fade-in intro on the LP version), louder guitar strums in the choruses, and less ensemble vocal work overall. Additionally, the single version fades during its three-bar instrumental outro whereas the album version tape-loops it to six bars upon fade-out. Further, while the album version has a relatively wide stereo image, the single version is mixed very narrowly (essentially mono) with stereo reverberation effects on some bongo passages and select guitar flourishes. The aforementioned remixed/edited version is the one included on the compilation album The Very Best of Fleetwood Mac. The single version is also available as a bonus track on the 2004 remastered CD release of the album Fleetwood Mac.

Cash Box wrote that "versatility is again demonstrated with a boiling rhythm subtly driving a soft McCartney-like vocal, shaded by organ and sweet, answering harmony." Record World said the song has a "clean, confident folk-rock sound" and that "Christine McVie takes the lead here over a network of jangly acoustic guitars, singing in a rich, deep voice."

Personnel
 Christine McVie – Vox Continental organ, electric piano, lead vocals
 Lindsey Buckingham – electric and acoustic guitars, backing vocals
 Stevie Nicks – backing vocals
 John McVie – bass guitar
 Mick Fleetwood – drums, bongos, shaker

Chart performance

Weekly charts

Year-end charts

References

Bibliography
The Great Rock Discography. Martin C. Strong. Page 378.

External links
 

Fleetwood Mac songs
1975 singles
Songs written by Christine McVie
Song recordings produced by Keith Olsen
Reprise Records singles